Hawkstone Hall is a  early 18th-century country mansion near Hodnet, Shropshire, England which was more recently occupied as the pastoral centre of a religious organisation for many years. It is a Grade I listed building. It is currently a wedding and events venue with hotel bedrooms, after being converted by its new owners.

History
The house was built between 1701 and 1725 by Richard Hill of Hawkstone (1655–1727), second of the Hill baronets, of Hawkstone. Brothers Rowland (1st Viscount Hill) and Robert Hill, who fought at the 1815 Battle of Waterloo were both born at the Hall.  The manor was seat of a branch the Shropshire Hill family for more than 300 years.

The manor was purchased, together with Soulton by Sir Rowland Hill and Thomas Leigh from Thomas Lodge in 1556, under long leases (until 1610) for quiet enjoyment by his brother Edward Lodge.

Bankruptcy for Rowland Clegg-Hill, the 3rd Viscount Hill on his death in 1895, forced the sale of the hall's contents and the split up of the estate by 1906.

The house was sold to the Liberal politician George Whitely, who had previously represented Stockport and Pudsey in the House of Commons, where he was a Liberal whip in Parliament – later to become Baron Marchamley in 1908. George Whiteley had the hall renovated and the wings reduced in length by William Tomkinsons of Liverpool, supervised by H.P. Dallow, brother in law of Henry Price. The chapel wing was reconstructed as a games room with dance floor and the other wing as servants’ quarters.

The hall was acquired after Lord Marchamley's death by the Roman Catholic Redemptorist Order in 1926 and, until 1973, was a seminary. The Order added a chapel in 1932 and further extended the Hall in 1962, converting the north-east service wing into a residential wing. The seminary relocated in 1973, and since 1975 the Hall was a Pastoral and Renewal Centre.

The property was put up for sale in 2014.
In June 2017, the hall was purchased by The Distinctly Hospitable Group Ltd, which also owns a wedding and events venue, "Weston Hall", and a gastro-pub, "The Saracens Head", both located in Weston, Staffordshire. In August 2017, the new owners received change of use planning permission, for a wedding and events venue with hotel bedrooms. A refurbishment took place in late 2017 until mid-2018, when the venue opened.

See also
Hawkstone Park
Soulton Hall
Grade I listed buildings in Shropshire
Listed buildings in Hodnet, Shropshire

References

External links
 

Grade I listed buildings in Shropshire
Country houses in Shropshire